The Castello di Barrugeri, also known as Birigirum, was a castle in Aragona, Sicily. It was built in around 1295.

No remains of the castle have survived, and its site is now flat agricultural land.

References

Barrugeri
Barrugeri
Buildings and structures in the Province of Agrigento
Buildings and structures completed in the 13th century
Demolished buildings and structures in Italy
Medieval Italian architecture